Mahimalai is a village in the Papanasam taluk of Thanjavur district, Tamil Nadu, India.  A Traditional village settled on the banks of the Vennaru.

Demographics 

As per the 2001 census, Mahimalai had a total population of 496 with 240 males and 256 females. The sex ratio was 1067. The literacy rate was 46.83.

References 

 

Villages in Thanjavur district